The Sindhi diaspora consists of Sindhi people who have emigrated from the historical Sindh province of British India, as well as the modern Sindh province of Pakistan, to other countries and regions of the world, as well as their descendants.Apart from South Asia, there is a large and well-established community of Sindhis throughout different continents of the world including Malaysia, Oman, Singapore, UAE, USA and UK where they have established themselves as a trade diaspora.

India

In 1947, about half of the Sindhi Hindu community had to migrate to India.  census, there were about 2.7 million Sindhis living in India living mostly in Western states of India like Maharashtra, Gujarat and Rajasthan.

Sri Lanka

Earliest groups of Sindhis came to the island of the modern day country of Sri Lanka estimated two centuries ago in hopes for business and trade. and they came via migration from Hyderabad city of Sindh. and most were Hindus that came to Sri Lanka due to business.

Foreign lands

There is a sizeable population of Sindhis in the United Kingdom and United States, other populations include in Australia and Canada. It is estimated that around 24,000 Sindhi of Afghanistan are part of a much larger Sindhi people group. Almost all of the Sindhis in Afghanistan are Hanafite Muslim.

See also
Sindhi Hindus in Gibraltar
Hinduism in Ghana
Hinduism in Sindh Province
Hinduism in Australia
Hinduism in Afghanistan
Indians in Afghanistan

References

External links

 
Pakistani diaspora
Indian diaspora by ethnic group
Ethnic groups in Pakistan